Dehak (also Romanized as Dehek and Dihik) is a village in Arabkhaneh Rural District, Shusef District, Nehbandan County, South Khorasan Province, Iran. At the 2006 census, its population was 799, in 205 families.

References 

Populated places in Nehbandan County